The  Newark Drawbridge, also known as the Morristown Line Bridge, is a  railroad bridge on the Passaic River between Newark and Harrison,  New Jersey. Opened in 1903, it is owned and operated by New Jersey Transit.

History

Rail service across the river was generally oriented to bringing passengers and freight from the points west over the Hackensack Meadows to Bergen Hill, where tunnels and cuts provided access to terminals on the Hudson River.

In 1836, the Morris and Essex Railroad established a right-of-way from the west at Orange to Newark, from where it used the New Jersey Rail Road at Centre Street to cross the river and travel east to its terminal at Paulus Hook on the waterfront in Jersey City. By 1855 it built its own bridge across the Passaic. By the early 1860s, the railroad had established the alignment across the Kearny Meadows and began using the Long Dock Tunnel to Hoboken.

In the early 1900s railroad elevated the line approaching the river which previously ran at grade along Division Street in Newark and built the current bridge.

In 1945, the Morris and Essex Railroad officially merged into the Delaware, Lackawanna and Western Railroad. DL&W merged with the Erie Railroad in 1960 to form the Erie Lackawanna Railroad, which was absorbed by Conrail in 1976; New Jersey Transit has operated all passenger service since 1983.

Operations
Since 1998 rules regulating drawbridge operations require a 24-hour notice. The bridge at milepost 7.48 is used exclusively by New Jersey Transit rail operations for the  Montclair-Boonton Line and both branches of the Morris and Essex Lines, the Morristown Line and the Gladstone Branch. It is situated just east of Newark Broad Street Station, the first stop after the lines travelling west from Hoboken Terminal and Secaucus Junction converge. In 2004, NJT contracted a study to determine the condition of the bridge and to begin long-term planning for its future replacement. In 2009-2010, the bridge underwent $23 million project for maintenance and repairs, funded by the agency and performed by Skanska.

See also
Lower Hack Lift
Bergen Tunnels
Timeline of Jersey City area railroads
List of crossings of the Lower Passaic River
List of bridges, tunnels, and cuts in Hudson County, New Jersey
NJT movable bridges

References

External links

Passaic River Railroad Bridge at Bridgehunter.com
William Stickel Memorial Bridge and NJ Transit Railroad Bridge image by Ronald C. Saari

Bridges completed in 1903
Bridges in Newark, New Jersey
Bridges in Hudson County, New Jersey
Railroad bridges in New Jersey
Swing bridges in the United States
Delaware, Lackawanna and Western Railroad bridges
NJ Transit bridges
Bridges over the Passaic River
Steel bridges in the United States
1903 establishments in New Jersey